Mahapanya Vidayalai (Thai: มหาปัญญาวิทยาลัย), translated roughly as a college of wisdom, is an international Buddhist school located in Hat Yai, Songkhla Province, Thailand. The college is affiliated with Mahachulalongkornrajavidyalaya University.

Founded by Oou Joo Heng, Supreme Patriarch of Anamikaya (the Vietnamese Mahayana Buddhist sect of Thailand) and with support of  the Theravada Sangha, the school was launched in 2002. It offers high school education as well as an international bachelor's degree program in Buddhist studies with a concentration in Mahayana Buddhism.

External links
http://www.mahapanya.ac.th: MVP website

Colleges in Thailand
Buddhist schools
Songkhla province
Educational institutions established in 2002
2002 establishments in Thailand